Ronald McMahon (31 October 1942 – 11 December 2010) was an Irish equestrian. He competed at the 1972 Summer Olympics and the 1976 Summer Olympics.

References

External links
 

1942 births
2010 deaths
Irish male equestrians
Olympic equestrians of Ireland
Equestrians at the 1972 Summer Olympics
Equestrians at the 1976 Summer Olympics
People from Rathfarnham
Sportspeople from South Dublin (county)